The Central Intelligence Service (CIS, KYP) is the intelligence-gathering body of Cyprus. It was reorganised and given official status by a 14 April 2016 Parliamentary bill. The CIS was initially founded in 1970 by President Archbishop Makarios. The new Independent Authority was renamed "Cyprus Intelligence Service" and is responsible for internal and external national security, i.e. a Cypriot combination of MI5 and MI6.

Since 4 May 2016, the Cyprus President Nicos Anastasiades has been expected to appoint (Presidential proposal appointment by Council of Ministers) the director of the new CIS and the two sub-commanders under the new legislation (Article 7). The new law, N. 75(I) of 2016, was published in the official journal on 4 May 2016 and entered into force immediately. No appointments have been made to implement the new law. The decision was taken to continue with the old structure of the service until the necessary regulations required by the new law are enacted and also the prospect of a solution of the Cyprus Problem played a role for this decision.

Before the entry into force of the new law and until today, the political director has been Ambassador Kyriakos Kouros and the director Marios Christofides, who is a senior police officer. The rest of the members are either police officers or members of the Cyprus National Guard placed in the CIS Headquarters in Ayios Andreas, Nicosia.

Under the new law, the CIS will be able to have its own employees either as permanent members of the intelligence services or under contract and even be able to buy services from the private sector. Its budget will be confidential and under the control of the new director.

The new CIS Law contains 35 Articles and enacts the Cyprus Intelligence Service as an independent authority liable to the President of the Republic, currently Nikolaos Chrysanthou Anastasiades (2013-2018), and the Council of Ministers.

Operational History

UN documents leak
The Cypriot Intelligence Service is believed to be the culprit of one of the largest intelligence thefts in UN history, having stolen over 6500 documents and files containing classified files on the UNs negotiations with the Turkish and Turkish-Cypriot leaders.
A Greek-Cypriot intelligence officer reportedly befriended Sonja Bachmann, a senior aide of Alexander Downer (Who was Australian Foreign Minister and at the time a senior UN adviser to the Secretary-General Ban Ki-moon).
The operation is believed to have begun around the date of 10 September 2009, when the second round of talks was to begin. The documents being leaked were originally sent to Phileleftheros under the guise of the leaks being sent from New York as a means to throw off investigators as to where the leaks were originally originating (later claimed to have found out to be from somewhere in Nicosia).
To gain the information, KYP used hackers to steal Buchmann's e-mail passwords, and then using that, during hours she was not present at her hotel, officers accessed her e-mails and downloaded all her files.

Some of the leaked files include:
A meeting between Alexander Downer and Ahmet Davutoğlu (Then Foreign Minister of Turkey)
A meeting between Downer and Mehmet Ali Talat (Turkish-Cypriot leader)
A meeting that happened in New York between Lynn Pascoe (Then Under-Secretary-General of the United Nations for the United Nations Department of Political and Peacebuilding Affairs) and Frank Urbancic (Then US ambassador to Cyprus)
A document that divided members of the Holy Synod of Cyprus based on their views regarding the Annan plan

Surveillance of Espen Barth Eide
Whilst Espen Barth Eide was serving as the Special Adviser for Cyprus, it was to the belief of KYP, that Espen was a national security threat who was working to undermine the cypriot government and as a result was placed under surveillance.

Before Eide was set to leave Cyprus, he set up a secret meeting with the then leader of the communist party of Cyprus, Andros Kyprianou, with the meeting being set up by Kyprianou's personal secretary and Mr. Eide via SMS and in secret, however, KYP had tapped Eides phone and so were alerted to the meeting and had set up surveillance outside the headquarters of AKEL (Cypriot communist party), where the meeting was to take place.

A few days later, Fileleftheros published an article stating that the head of a political party was engaging in secret meetings with Eide and because of that, Mr. Kyprianou confronted President Anastasiades to which the President reportedly said "I know you may also meet with Mr. Eida, either at the party office or elsewhere" and also reportedly said to him "It is possible that the one who you meet is being watched".

When the press published the information about the meeting, KYP Director Kyriakos Kouros contacted Kyprianou directly and assured him that he (Kyprianou) himself was not under surveillance but that Eide was a seemingly national security threat.

Leadership
Kyriacos Kouros is the current chief of the KYP. He replaced Andreas Pentaras in 2015, after Pentaras resigned following allegations that the KYP had purchased intrusive phone surveillance technology.

References

1970 establishments in Cyprus
Government agencies established in 1970
Intelligence agencies
Law enforcement agencies of Cyprus